Nam Hyun-woo (born 9 January 1985) is a Korean former professional tennis player.

Born in Incheon, Nam featured in a single Davis Cup tie for South Korea, against Malaysia in Kuala Lumpur in 2004. He won his singles rubber over Mohammed-Noor Noordin.

Nam, a quarterfinalist at the 2007 Summer Universiade, twice appeared in the main draw of a ATP Tour tournament, as a qualifier at both the 2007 Japan Open and 2008 China Open.

See also
List of South Korea Davis Cup team representatives

References

External links
 
 
 

1985 births
Living people
South Korean male tennis players
Sportspeople from Incheon
Competitors at the 2007 Summer Universiade
21st-century South Korean people